Dong Bac's trident bat (Aselliscus dongbacana) is a species of bat in the family Hipposideridae. It is found in northeastern Vietnam. Its type locality is Na Phong cave, Ba Be National Park, Bac Kan Province, Vietnam.

Aselliscus dongbacana is estimated to have diverged from Aselliscus stoliczkanus during the late Miocene.

References

Aselliscus
Mammals described in 2015
Bats of Southeast Asia